The Embassy of Switzerland in New Zealand is the official representation of Switzerland in New Zealand and in a number of Pacific island countries.

The Chancery is located in the Maritime Tower, a modern seventeen storey office building overlooking the Wellington Harbour. The building was completed in 2006. Until 2009 the location had been on Panama Street. The Residence is a historical building in Woburn, Lower Hutt, 15 kilometers from the Wellington city center.

Tasks of the embassy
The Embassy is responsible for diplomatic relations between Switzerland, New Zealand, Fiji, Samoa, Tonga, Tuvalu and the Cook Islands. It represents Swiss political, consular, economic, financial, legal, scientific and cultural interests. The Embassy is also consular representation for Niue and American Samoa, the Ambassador serving as Consul General in this United States territory.

Around 7,000 Swiss citizens live in New Zealand and the Embassy offers the whole range of consular services to this population. It is supported in its consular and diplomatic work by subordinate posts lead by Honorary Consuls, the Consulate of Switzerland in Auckland, the Consulate General in Suva, Fiji, the Consulate General in Apia, Samoa, and the Consulate General in Nuku'alofa, Tonga.

The following table shows the numbers of Swiss citizens living in these countries.

(Source: website of the Swiss Confederation)

History 
The first representation of Switzerland in New Zealand was a Consulate established in 1912, initially located in Auckland but relocated to Wellington in 1937. Walter Schmid was from 1937 the first career consular officer heading the post. In 1955, the representation was upgraded to a Consulate General and diplomat Pierre Aubaret became the first Consul General. After having established diplomatic relations with New Zealand in 1962, the representation became an Embassy. Jean-Pierre Weber was its first Chargé d'affaires from 1963. In 1966, the Consulate in Auckland was reopened with an honorary consul in charge. Max Corti was the first Swiss resident Ambassador to New Zealand from 1969.

In 2007 (Samoa), 2012 (Fiji) and 2017 (Tonga) Switzerland extended its representative network in the region by opening Consulates General with an honorary consul general heading the post.

After the establishment of diplomatic relations with New Zealand, Switzerland took this step in 1985 with the Kingdom of Tonga,  in 1987 with Western Samoa, today Samoa, in 1989 with the Republic of Fiji, in 2005 with Tuvalu and in 2010 with the Cook Islands, a self governing territory in free association with New Zealand.

Swiss representatives 
The current Ambassador of Switzerland in Wellington is Michael Winzap. He also serves as Consul General of Switzerland to American Samoa, a United States Territory.

The following Swiss representatives have served in New Zealand, Fiji, Samoa and Tonga.

Representatives in Wellington

(Source: website of the Swiss Confederation)

Representatives in Auckland

(Source: website of the Swiss Confederation)

Of particular historical interest is Sir John Allum CBE who served as Mayor of Auckland from 1941 to 1952 and is remembered as father of the famous Auckland Harbour Bridge.

Representatives in Suva, Fiji

(Source: website of the Swiss Confederation)

Representatives in Apia, Samoa

(Source: website of the Swiss Confederation)

Representatives in Nuku'alofa, Kingdom of Tonga

(Source: website of the Swiss Confederation)

Swiss citizens
John Webber (1751–1793), Thomas Brunner (1821–1874) and Jakob Lauper (1815–1891) are notable New Zealand pioneers of Swiss descent. John Webber was the first Swiss who ever set his foot on New Zealand soil. He accompanied Captain James Cook on his third and final Pacific (1776–79) voyage as the expedition's Artist. London-born Swiss explorer Thomas Brunner arrived in New Zealand in 1841. He is known for his extensive expeditions on the west coast of the South Island. The town of Brunner, Lake Brunner, Mount Brunner and Brunner Mine were all named after him. Lauper Stream, Lauper Peak and Lauper Bivouac, all situated on the upper Rakaia River  on the South Island, remember Jakob Lauper (1815–1891),  gold prospector and explorer,  who, together with John Henry Withcombe, had been in 1863 the first European to cross the Southern Alps. The first Swiss farmer who settled in Taranaki in 1870 was Felix Hunger (1837–1918).

There are five Swiss clubs in New Zealand, in Auckland, in Hamilton, in Taranaki, in Wellington and in Christchurch. The first four clubs are situated on the North Island and form the Swiss Society of New Zealand which publishes its own magazine "Helvetia" since 1935.

See also 
 Foreign relations of Switzerland
 List of diplomatic missions of Switzerland
 List of diplomatic missions in New Zealand
 List of Ambassadors and High Commissioners to and from New Zealand

References

External links 
Embassy of Switzerland in New Zealand
Consulate of Switzerland in Auckland
Consulate General in Suva
Consulate General in Apia
Consulate General in Nuku'alofa
Swiss Society of New Zealand

New Zealand Foreign Affairs and Trade, Switzerland

Diplomatic missions in Wellington
Diplomatic missions of Switzerland